The 1946 Indiana Inercollegiate Conference football season was the season of college football played by the 15 member schools of the Indiana Intercollegiate Conference (IIC) as part of the 1946 college football season.

The Butler Bulldogs, in their ninth season under head coach Tony Hinkle, won the IIC championship with a 7–1 record (6–0 against IIC opponents). The Bulldogs led the conference in scoring with an average of 21.75 points scored per game. Four Butler players received first-team honors the 1946 All-Indiana Intercollegiate Conference football team: halfback Orville Williams, end Knute Dobkins, tackle Mel Perrone, and center Ott Hurrle.

The Evansville Purple Aces, in their first year under head coach Don Ping, finished in second place with a 7–1–2 record (2–0 against IIC opponents). Tackle Bob Hawkins was the only Evansville player to receive first-team honors on the all-conference team.

The Wabash Little Giants, led by head coach Glen Harmeson, finished in third place with a 7–1 record. Wabash led the conference in scoring defense, shutting out six of eight opponents and giving up an average of only 4.0 points per game. Three Wabash players received first-team all-conference honors: quarterback Frank Roman, fullback J.K. Allerdice, and guard Bill Duchon.

Conference overview

Teams

Butler

The 1946 Butler Bulldogs football team was an American football team that represented Butler University as a member of the Indiana Intercollegiate Conference (IIC) during the 1946 college football season. In its ninth season under head coach Tony Hinkle, the team compiled a 7–1 record (6–0 against IIC opponents) and won the IIC championship. The team played its home games at the Butler Bowl in Indianapolis.

Evansville

The 1946 Evansville Purple Aces football team represented Butler University as a member of the IIC. In their first season under head coach Don Ping, the Purple Aces compiled a 7–1–2 record (2–0 against IIC opponents), finished in second place in the IIC, and outscored opponents by a total of 149 to 52.

Wabash

The 1946 Wabash Little Giants football team represented Wabash College of Crawfordsville, Indiana, as a member of the IIC. In their first season under head coach Glen Harmeson, the Little Giants compiled a 7–1 record (5–1 against IIC opponents), finished in third place in the IIC, shut out six of eight opponents, led the conference in scoring defense (4.0 points per game), and outscored opponents by a total of 144 to 32.

Earlham

The 1946 Earlham Quakers football team represented Earlham College of Richmond, Indiana, as a member of the IIC. Led by head coach J. Owen Huntsman, the Quakers compiled a 5–3 record (4–2 against IIC opponents), finished in fourth place in the IIC, and outscored opponents by a total of 105 to 57.

Saint Joseph's

The 1946 Saint Joseph's Pumas football team represented Saint Joseph's University as a member of the IIC. Led by head coach Richard Scharf, the Pumas compiled a 3–4 record (2–1 against IIC opponents), finished in fifth place in the IIC, and were outscored  by a total of 81 to 59.

Hanover

The 1946 Hanover Panthers football team represented Hanover College of Hanover, Indiana, as a member of the IIC. In their first season under head coach Don Veller, the Panthers compiled a 4–3 record (3–2 against IIC opponents), finished in sixth place in the IIC, and outscored opponents by a total of 76 to 74.

Franklin

The 1946 Franklin Grizzlies football team represented Franklin College of Franklin, Indiana, as a member of the IIC. In their 16th year under head coach Roy Tillotson, the Grizzlies compiled a 4–4 record (3–3 against IIC opponents), finished in seventh place in the IIC, and outscored opponents by a total of 81 to 65.

Ball State

The 1946 Ball State Cardinals football team was an American football team that represented Ball State Teachers College (later renamed Ball State University) in the Indiana Intercollegiate Conference (ICC) during the 1946 college football season. In its 11th season under head coach John Magnabosco, the team compiled a 3–4–1 record (3–3 against ICC opponents) and finished in a tie for seventh place out of 15 teams in the conference.

Indiana Central

The 1946 Indiana Central Greyhounds football team represented Indiana Central College (later renamed the University of Indianapolis) as a member of the IIC. Led by head coach Ed Bright, the Greyhounds compiled a 3–4 record (3–4 against IIC opponents), finished in ninth place in the IIC, and were outscored by a total of 92 to 44.

Indiana State

The 1946 Indiana State Sycamores football team was an American football team that represented Indiana State University as a member of the Indiana Intercollegiate Conference (IIC) during the 1946 college football season. In its 14th non-consecutive season under head coach Walter E. Marks, and its first since the end of World War II, the team compiled a 4–4 record (2–4 against IIC opponents) and outscored all opponents by a total of 70 to 59. The team played its home games in Terre Haute, Indiana.

Manchester

The 1946 Manchester Spartans football team represented Manchester University of North Manchester, Indiana, as a member of the IIC. Led by head coach Phili H. Kemmerer, the Spartans compiled a 3–5 record (2–4 against IIC opponents), finished in a tie for tenth place in the IIC, and were outscored by a total of 120 to 68.

DePauw

The 1946 DePauw Tigers football team represented DePauw University of Greencastle, Indiana, as a member of the IIC. In their first and only season under head coach Robert L. Nipper, the Tigers compiled a 1–5–2 record (1–2 against IIC opponents), finished in 12th place in the IIC, and were outscored by a total of 195 to 58.

Canterbury

The 1946 Canterbury Purple Warriors football team represented Canterbury College of Danville, Indiana, as a member of the IIC. Led by head coach Henry G. Miller, the Purple Warriors compiled a 1–7 record (1–4 against IIC opponents), finished in 13th place in the IIC, and were outscored by a total of 140 to 43.

Rose Poly

The 1946 Rose Poly Engineers football team represented Rose Polytechnic Institute of Terre Haute, Indiana (now known as Rose–Hulman Institute of Technology) as a member of the IIC. In their 16th non-consecutive season under head coach Phil Brown, the Engineers compiled a 1–7–1 record (1–5 against IIC opponents), finished in 14th place in the IIC, and were outscored by a total of 155 to 46.

Valparaiso

The 1946 Valparaiso Crusaders football team represented Valparaiso University as a member of the IIC. In their first season under head coach Emory Bauer, the team compiled a 1–7 record (0–3 against IIC opponents), finished in last place in the IIC, and were outscored by a total of 156 to 50.

All-conference team
The IIC coaches selected a 1946 All-Indiana Conference football team. Conference champion Butler placed four players on the first team: halfback Orville Williams, end Knute Dobkins, tackle Mel Perrone, and center Ott Hurrle. Wabash followed with three players named to the first team: quarterback Frank Roman, fullback J.K. Allerdice, and guard Bill Duchon. Indiana State, despite finishing 10th in the conference, placed two on the first team: halfback Max Woolsey and guard Dick Guyer.

First team
 Quarterback: Frank Roman, Wabash
 Halfback: Orville Williams, Butler; Max Woolsey, Indiana State
 Fullback: J.K. Allerdice, Wabash
 Ends: Mike Patanelli, Ball State; Knute Dobkins, Butler
 Tackles: Mel Perrone, Butler; Bob Hawkins, Evansville
 Guards: Bill Duchon, Wabash; Dick Guyer, Indiana State
 Center: Ott Hurrle, Butler

References

 
1946 in sports in Indiana